{{Speciesbox
|status = LR/lc
|status_system = IUCN2.3
|status_ref = 
|genus = Weinmannia
|species = affinis
|authority = A.Gray
|synonyms = Pterophylla affinis (A.Gray) Pillon & H.C.Hopkins
|synonyms_ref = <ref>Weinmannia affinis A.Gray Plants of the World Online, Kew Science. Accessed 26 September 2022.</ref>
}}Weinmannia affinis'' is a species of plant in the family Cunoniaceae. It is endemic to Fiji.

References

Endemic flora of Fiji
affinis
Least concern plants
Taxonomy articles created by Polbot